Sumio (written: 澄男, 澄夫, 澄雄, 純男, 純生 or 寿美雄) is a masculine Japanese given name. Notable people with the name include:

, Japanese judoka
, Japanese physicist
, Japanese classical composer
, Japanese politician
, Japanese racewalker
, Japanese poet
, Japanese composer and music producer

Japanese masculine given names